Cinéma vérité is a documentary film-making style combining naturalistic techniques with stylized cinematic devices.

Cinéma vérité may refer to:

 Cinema Verite (2011 film), a film by HBO Films about the making of the television series An American Family
 Cinéma Vérité: Defining the Moment, a 1999 documentary film
 Cinéma Vérité (album), the first album by alternative rock group Dramarama

See also
 Cinema Verity, a defunct British production company
 Kino-Pravda, or Cinema Truth, a Russian film series